Robert Edmund Poli (February 27, 1936 – September 15, 2014)  was an American labor union leader who was president of the
Professional Air Traffic Controllers Organization (PATCO) at the time of its ill-fated strike in 1981 against the U.S. Federal Aviation Administration.

Early life
Poli was born in Pittsburgh and grew up in a working-class home. His parents Peter and Cora owned a luncheonette,  and his father carved religious statuary and worked at a dairy. Following high school, Poli served four years in the U.S. Air Force, where he learned to be an air traffic controller. He began employment with the FAA in the early 1960s.

Career
For 13 years Poli was an FAA air traffic controller, first at the control tower in Pittsburgh and then at an area control center in Cleveland, where he became a local PATCO union leader. He rose to vice president of the union in 1972 and president in 1980.

In the 1960s and 70s, air traffic controllers became increasingly dissatisfied with their working conditions and salaries, staging a number of work slowdowns and "sickouts". As federal employees, they were prohibited by law from striking. By 1981, however, a strike seemed imminent. Poli reached an agreement with the government for higher salaries and better benefits, but the union membership voted to reject the pact, even though Poli said the terms were fair. On August 3, 1981 about 12,000 of the 17,000 controllers went on strike.

President Reagan gave the strikers an ultimatum to return to work within 48 hours or lose their jobs. On the day the strike began, Poli declared his readiness to go to jail. "We are going to stay on strike as long as it takes," he said. Several local union leaders were briefly jailed for violating court orders, but Poli was not, although he was fined. Nearly all striking controllers did not return to work, and the president fired them. The FAA filled vacant positions with supervisors, other staff and military controllers, but the drastic cut in the number of on-duty controllers caused a significant reduction in U.S. air traffic. The federal government decertified the union, which went bankrupt.  Poli resigned as PATCO president at end of 1981, saying "the time is right."

Later life
For the next two years, Poli remained out of public view. He wrote a book that was never published, according to his son. In his career after the FAA, Poli was a real estate salesman in Florida, General manager of a BMW auto dealership in Virginia, and briefly a labor negotiator for General Electric.

Poli was married three times and had two children from his first marriage. He died at age 78 of kidney failure at his home in Meridian, Idaho.

References

American trade union leaders
People from Pittsburgh
Air traffic controllers' trade unions
1936 births
2014 deaths